The 2006 Arizona gubernatorial election was held on November 7, 2006. Incumbent Democratic Governor Janet Napolitano was reelected in a landslide. Napolitano's widespread popularity contributed to her easy reelection; her general approval rating in October 2006, one month before the election, was at 58%.

This was the last time until 2022 that a Democrat was elected Governor of Arizona. It is also the last time that a Democrat swept every county in the state in a statewide election.

Democratic primary

Candidates
 Janet Napolitano, incumbent Governor of Arizona

Results

Republican primary

Candidates
 Don Goldwater, activist, former board member of the Goldwater Institute and nephew of Barry Goldwater
 Mike Harris, businessman
 Len Munsil, former president of the Center for Arizona Policy (CAP)
 Gary Tupper, contractor

Results

Libertarian primary

Candidates
 Barry Hess, currency speculator and perennial candidate

Results

General election

Predictions

Polling

Results

See also
 2006 United States gubernatorial elections
 Governors of Arizona

References

External links
Official campaign websites (Archived)
 Janet Napolitano
 Len Munsil
 Barry Hess

2006
Gubernatorial
2006 United States gubernatorial elections